There are two different compounds of great icosahedron and great stellated dodecahedron: one is a dual compound and a stellation of the great icosidodecahedron, the other is a stellation of the icosidodecahedron.

Dual compound 
It can be seen as a polyhedron compound of a great icosahedron and great stellated dodecahedron. It is one of five compounds constructed from a Platonic solid or Kepler-Poinsot solid, and its dual. It is a stellation of the great icosidodecahedron.

It has icosahedral symmetry (Ih) and it has the same vertex arrangement as a great rhombic triacontahedron.

This can be seen as one of the two three-dimensional equivalents of the compound of two pentagrams ({10/4} "decagram"); this series continues into the fourth dimension as compounds of star 4-polytopes.

Stellation of the icosidodecahedron 

This polyhedron is a stellation of the icosidodecahedron, and given as Wenninger model index 61. It has the same vertex arrangement as a rhombic triacontahedron, its convex hull.

The stellation facets for construction are:

See also 
 Compound of two tetrahedra
 Compound of cube and octahedron
 Compound of dodecahedron and icosahedron
 Compound of small stellated dodecahedron and great dodecahedron

References
 , p. 90.
 , pp. 51-53.
 Martyn Cundy and A. Rollett. "Great Icosahedron Plus Great Stellated Dodecahedron". §3.10.4 in Mathematical Models, 3rd ed. Stradbroke, England: Tarquin Pub., pp. 132-133, 1989.

External links 

 Great Stellated Dodecahedron plus Great Icosahedron - metallic paper model
 VRML George Hart: VRML transparent model

Polyhedral stellation
Polyhedral compounds